Terence Graham Parry Jones (1 February 1942 – 21 January 2020) was a Welsh comedian, director, historian, actor, writer and member of the Monty Python comedy team.

After graduating from Oxford University with a degree in English, Jones and writing partner Michael Palin wrote and performed for several high-profile British comedy programmes, including Do Not Adjust Your Set and The Frost Report, before creating Monty Python's Flying Circus with Cambridge graduates Graham Chapman, John Cleese, and Eric Idle and American animator-filmmaker Terry Gilliam. Jones was largely responsible for the programme's innovative, surreal structure, in which sketches flowed from one to the next without the use of punch lines. He made his directorial debut with the Python film Holy Grail, which he co-directed with Gilliam, and also directed the subsequent Python films Life of Brian and The Meaning of Life.

Jones co-created and co-wrote with Palin the anthology series Ripping Yarns. He also wrote an early draft of Jim Henson's film Labyrinth and is credited with the screenplay, though quite little of his work actually remained in the final cut. Jones was a well-respected medieval historian, having written several books and presented television documentaries about the period, as well as a prolific children's book author. In 2016, Jones received a Lifetime Achievement award at the BAFTA Cymru Awards for his outstanding contribution to television and film. After living for several years with a degenerative aphasia, he gradually lost the ability to speak and died in 2020 from frontotemporal dementia.

Early life 
Jones was born on 1 February 1942 in the seaside town of Colwyn Bay, on the north coast of Wales, the son of housewife Dilys Louisa (Newnes), and Alick George Parry-Jones, a bank clerk. The family home was named Bodchwil. As he recalled in The Pythons Autobiography by The Pythons, he was "born right bang slap in the middle of World War Two," while his father served with the Royal Air Force in Scotland. A week after he was born, his father was posted in India as a Flight Lieutenant (Temporary). His brother Nigel was two years his senior. He reunited with his father when the war ended four years later; of their first meeting at Colwyn Bay railway station he recalled: "I'd only ever been kissed by the smooth lips of a lady up until that point, so his bristly moustache was quite disturbing!" When Jones was four and a half, the family moved to Claygate, Surrey, England.

Jones attended Esher COE primary school and the Royal Grammar School in Guildford, where he was school captain in the 1960–61 academic year. He read English at St Edmund Hall, Oxford, but "strayed into history". He became interested in the medieval period through reading Chaucer as part of his English degree. He graduated with a 2:1. While there, he performed comedy with future Monty Python castmate Michael Palin in the Oxford Revue. Jones was a year ahead of Palin at Oxford, and on first meeting him Palin states, "The first thing that struck me was what a nice bloke he was. He had no airs and graces. We had a similar idea of what humour could do and where it should go, mainly because we both liked characters; we both appreciated that comedy wasn't just jokes."

Career history

Before Python and early Python 
Jones appeared in Twice a Fortnight with Michael Palin, Graeme Garden, Bill Oddie and Jonathan Lynn, as well as the television series The Complete and Utter History of Britain (1969). He appeared in Do Not Adjust Your Set (1967–69) with Palin, Eric Idle and David Jason. He wrote for The Frost Report and several other David Frost programmes on British television. Of Jones' contributions as a performer to Monty Python's Flying Circus, his depictions of middle-aged women (or "ratbag old women" as termed by the BBC, also known as "pepper-pots" or "grannies from hell") are among the most memorable.

Directorial work 
Jones co-directed Monty Python and the Holy Grail with Terry Gilliam, and was sole director on two further Monty Python movies, Life of Brian and Monty Python's The Meaning of Life. As a film director, Jones finally gained fuller control of the projects and devised a distinct, signature style that relied on visual comedy and surreal touches to complement the jokes. He would repeatedly abandon punchlines and create fragmented, non-sequitur story arcs to bring out the deadpan  humour.   His later films include Erik the Viking (1989) and The Wind in the Willows (1996). In 2008, Jones wrote the libretto for and directed the opera Evil Machines. In 2011, he was commissioned to direct and write the libretto for another opera, entitled The Doctor's Tale.

Three of the films which Jones directed—The Meaning of Life, Monty Python's Life of Brian and Personal Services—were banned in Ireland.

Jones directed the 2015 comedy film Absolutely Anything, about a disillusioned schoolteacher who is given the chance to do anything he wishes by a group of aliens watching from space. The film features Simon Pegg, Kate Beckinsale, Robin Williams and the voices of the five remaining members of Monty Python. It was filmed in London during a six-week shoot.

In 2016, Jones directed Jeepers Creepers, a West End play about the life of comic Marty Feldman. It would be Jones' last directing work before his death.

Writer and brewer 
Jones wrote many books and screenplays, including comic works and more serious writing on medieval history.

A member of the Campaign for Real Ale, Jones also had interest in real ale and in 1977 co-founded the Penrhos Brewery, a microbrewery at Penrhos Court at Penrhos, Herefordshire, which ran until 1983.

Comedy 
Jones co-wrote Ripping Yarns with Palin. They also wrote a play, Underwood's Finest Hour, about an obstetrician distracted during a birth by the radio broadcast of a Test match, which played at the Lyric Theatre, Hammersmith, in 1981. Jones also wrote numerous works for children, including Fantastic Stories, The Beast with a Thousand Teeth and a collection of comic verse called The Curse of the Vampire's Socks.

Jones was the co-creator (with Gavin Scott) of the animated TV series Blazing Dragons (1996–1998), which parodied the Arthurian legends and Middle Ages periods. Reversing a common story convention, the series' protagonists are anthropomorphic dragons beset by evil humans.

Screenplays 
Jones wrote the screenplay for Labyrinth (1986), although his draft went through several rewrites and several other writers before being filmed; consequently, much of the finished film was not actually written by Jones.

History 

Jones wrote books and presented television documentaries on medieval and ancient history. His first book was Chaucer's Knight: The Portrait of a Medieval Mercenary (1980), which offers an alternative take on Geoffrey Chaucer's The Knight's Tale. Chaucer's knight is often interpreted as a paragon of Christian virtue, but Jones asserts that if one studies historical accounts of the battles the knight claims he was involved in, he can be interpreted as a typical mercenary and a potentially cold-blooded killer. He also co-wrote Who Murdered Chaucer? (2003) in which he argues that Chaucer was close to King Richard II, and that after Richard was deposed, Chaucer was persecuted to death by Thomas Arundel.

Jones' TV series also frequently challenged popular views of history. For example, in Terry Jones' Medieval Lives (2004; for which he received a 2004 Emmy nomination for "Outstanding Writing for Nonfiction Programming") he argues that the Middle Ages was a more sophisticated period than is popularly thought, and Terry Jones' Barbarians (2006) presents the cultural achievements of peoples conquered by the Roman Empire in a more positive light than Roman historians typically have, attributing the Sack of Rome in 410 AD to propaganda.

Column writing 
Jones wrote numerous columns for The Guardian, The Daily Telegraph and The Observer condemning the Iraq War. Many of these editorials were published in a paperback collection titled Terry Jones's War on the War on Terror.

In November 2011, his book Evil Machines was launched by the online publishing house Unbound at the Adam Street Club in London. It was the first book to be published by a crowdfunding website dedicated solely to books. Jones provided significant support to Unbound as they developed their publishing concept. In February 2018, Jones released The Tyrant and the Squire, also with Unbound.

Poetry 
Jones was a member of the Poetry Society, and his poems have appeared in Poetry Review.

Work with musicians 
Jones performed with the Carnival Band and appears on their 2007 CD Ringing the Changes.

In January 2008, the Teatro São Luiz, in Lisbon, Portugal, premiered Evil Machines – a musical play, written by Jones (based on his book), with original music by Portuguese composer Luis Tinoco. Jones was invited by the Teatro São Luiz to write and direct the play, after a successful run of Contos Fantásticos, a short play based on Jones' Fantastic Stories, also with music by Tinoco.

In January 2012 Jones announced that he was working with songwriter/producer Jim Steinman on a heavy metal version of The Nutcracker.

As performer 

Apart from a cameo in Terry Gilliam's Jabberwocky and a minor role as a drunken vicar in the BBC sitcom The Young Ones, Jones rarely appeared in work outside his own projects. From 2009 to 2011, however, he provided narration for The Legend of Dick and Dom, a CBBC fantasy series set in the Middle Ages. He also appears in two French films by Albert Dupontel: Le Créateur (1999) and Enfermés dehors (2006).

In 2009, Jones took part in the BBC Wales programme Coming Home about his Welsh family history. In July 2014, Jones reunited with the other four living Pythons to perform at ten dates (Monty Python Live (Mostly)) at the O2 Arena in London. This was Jones' last performance with the group prior to his aphasia diagnosis.

In October 2016, Jones received a standing ovation at the BAFTA Cymru Awards when he received a Lifetime Achievement award for his outstanding contribution to television and film.

Personal life

Marriages 
Jones married Alison Telfer in 1970; they had two children together, Sally in 1974 and Bill in 1976. They lived in Camberwell, London and had an open marriage. In 2009, Jones left Telfer for Anna Söderström; she was 41 years his junior and they had been in a relationship for five years. In September 2009, Söderström and Jones had a daughter, and in 2012 they married. The family settled in Highgate, North London.

Political views 
Jones published a number of articles on political and social commentary, principally in newspapers The Daily Telegraph, The Guardian, The Independent and The Observer. Many of these articles mocked the War on Terror, belittling it as "declaring war on an abstract noun" and comparing it to attempting to "annihilate mockery".

In August 2014, Jones was one of 200 public figures who signed a letter to The Guardian expressing their hope that Scotland would vote to remain part of the United Kingdom in September's referendum on that issue.

Health and death 
In October 2006, Jones was diagnosed with colon cancer and underwent surgery. After a complete cycle of chemotherapy, he became free of cancer. Later reminiscing about the event, he said, "Unfortunately, my illness is not nearly bad enough to sell many newspapers and the prognosis is even more disappointing."

In 2015, Jones was diagnosed with primary progressive aphasia, a form of frontotemporal dementia that impairs the ability to speak and communicate. He had first given cause for concern during the Monty Python reunion show Monty Python Live (Mostly) in July 2014 because of difficulties learning his lines. He became a campaigner for awareness of, and fundraiser for research into, dementia; and donated his brain for dementia research. By September 2016, he was no longer able to give interviews. By April 2017, he had lost the ability to say more than a few words of agreement.

Jones died from complications of dementia on 21 January 2020, 11 days short of his 78th birthday, at his home in Highgate. His family and close friends remembered him with a humanist funeral ceremony.

Selected bibliography

Fiction 
Douglas Adams' Starship Titanic: A Novel (1997),  – a novel based on the computer game of the same name by Douglas Adams.
Evil Machines (2011), 
Trouble On The Heath (2011), 
The Tyrant and the Squire (2018), 

Illustrated by Michael Foreman
Fairy Tales (1981), 
The Saga of Erik the Viking (1983),  – Children's Book Award 1984
Nicobobinus (1985), 
The Curse of the Vampire's Socks and Other Doggerel (1988),  – poetry
Fantastic Stories (1992), 
The Beast with a Thousand Teeth (1993), 
A Fish of the World (1993), 
The Sea Tiger (1994), 
The Fly-by-Night (1994), 
The Knight and the Squire (1997), 
The Lady and the Squire (2000),  – nominated for a Whitbread Award
Bedtime Stories (2002),  – with Nanette Newman
Animal Tales (2011), 

Illustrated by Brian Froud
Goblins of the Labyrinth (1986), 
The Goblin Companion: A Field Guide to Goblins (1996),  – an abridged re-release, in a smaller format, with the colour plates missing
Lady Cottington's Pressed Fairy Book (1994), 
Strange Stains and Mysterious Smells: Quentin Cottington's Journal of Faery Research (1996), 
Lady Cottington's Pressed Fairy Journal (1998), 
Lady Cottington's Fairy Album (2002), 

Illustrated by Martin Honeysett and Lolly Honeysett
Bert Fegg's Nasty Book for Boys and Girls with Michael Palin (1974)  - expanded and revised editions of the book appeared as Dr. Fegg's Nasty Book of Knowledge in the US in 1976 and Dr. Fegg's Encyclopeadia (sic) of all World Knowledge, in the UK in 1984.

Non-fiction 
 ; rev. ed. (1994), 
 
 
The Pythons Autobiography by The Pythons (with Graham Chapman (Estate), John Cleese, Terry Gilliam, Eric Idle, Michael Palin; edited by Bob McCabe). 

With Alan Ereira

Filmography

Television

Television acting roles

Presenter

Film

Film acting roles

Documentary series 
The Rupert Bear Story: A Tribute to Alfred Bestall (1982)
Crusades (1995)
Ancient Inventions – directed by Phil Grabsky and Daniel Percival (1998)
Gladiators: The Brutal Truth (2000)
The Surprising History of Egypt (USA, 2002) a.k.a. The Hidden History of Egypt (UK, 2003) – directed by Phil Grabsky
The Surprising History of Rome (USA, 2002) a.k.a. The Hidden History of Rome (UK, 2003) – directed by Phil Grabsky
The Surprising History of Sex and Love (2002) – directed by Alan Ereira and Phil Grabsky
Terry Jones' Medieval Lives (2004)
The Story of 1 (2005)
Terry Jones' Barbarians (2006)
Terry Jones' Great Map Mystery (2008)
In Charlie Chaplin's Footsteps with Terry Jones (2015)
Boom Bust Boom (2015)

Award and recognition 
Terry Jones was nominated for Grammy Awards three times for Best Comedy Recording:
 In 1975, for Matching Tie and Handkerchief (Album)
 In 1980, for Monty Python's Contractual Obligation Album (Album)
 In 1983, for Monty Python's The Meaning of Life (Album)
 In 1976, his directorial debut film Monty Python and the Holy Grail won the British Fantasy Awards.
 In 2016, an asteroid, 9622 Terryjones, was named in his honour.
 In 2016, he received a Lifetime Achievement award at the BAFTA Cymru Awards for his outstanding contribution to television and film.

See also

References

Further reading

External links 

 Terry Jones at the British Film Institute
 
 
 
 Terry Jones at the BBC Guide to Comedy
 Terry Jones at the Comedy Zone
 

1942 births
2020 deaths
20th-century Welsh comedians
20th-century Welsh male actors
20th-century Welsh writers
21st-century Welsh comedians
21st-century Welsh male actors
21st-century Welsh writers
Alumni of St Edmund Hall, Oxford
British children's writers
British comedy writers
British male comedy actors
British male television writers
British non-fiction writers
British parodists
British satirists
British surrealist artists
British television writers
Deaths from frontotemporal dementia
Deaths from primary progressive aphasia
Monty Python members
Deaths from dementia in England
People educated at Royal Grammar School, Guildford
People from Colwyn Bay
Welsh film directors
Welsh humanists
Welsh male comedians
Welsh male film actors
Welsh male television actors
Welsh screenwriters
Male non-fiction writers